The 2013 Toronto FC season was Toronto FC's seventh season in Major League Soccer, the top tier of soccer in the United States and Canada. Kevin Payne became the club's first president during the off-season. He also became the club's general manager. The season opened on March 2.

The club entered the season as the defending Canadian Championship winners.

Review and events

Kevin Payne became the club president and general manager during the off-season. The club fired Paul Mariner as head coach and was replaced by Ryan Nelsen, who was at the time an active player with Queens Park Rangers F.C. in England. Kevin Payne stated, in reference to Nelson's availability, that "We're not sure when he'll join us." Nelson terminated his QPR contract before the end of the season, and joined TFC in February, 2013.

The season opened with an away game on March 2 against the Vancouver Whitecaps FC and the following week played their only MLS match away from BMO Field, the home opener against Sporting Kansas City on March 9, 2013, with a then-record Toronto FC home MLS attendance of 25,991. The season finished with a home win against Montreal Impact on October 26.

Fixtures and results

Legend

Pre-season

MLS regular season

Match results

MLS regular season standings

Eastern Conference

Overall table
Note: the table below has no impact on playoff qualification and is used solely for determining host of the MLS Cup, certain CCL spots, and 2014 MLS draft. The conference tables are the sole determinant for teams qualifying to the playoffs

Results summary

Results by round

Canadian Championship

Semi final

Mid-season friendly

Player information

Squad and statistics

Squad, appearances and goals

|-
! colspan="10" style="background:#dcdcdc; text-align:center"| Goalkeeper

|-
! colspan="10" style="background:#dcdcdc; text-align:center"| Defenders

|-
! colspan="10" style="background:#dcdcdc; text-align:center"| Midfielders

|-
! colspan="10" style="background:#dcdcdc; text-align:center"| Forwards

|-
! colspan="10" style="background:#dcdcdc; text-align:center"| No Longer With Team

|}

Goals against average

Bookings

Transactions

In

Loan In

Out

References

Toronto FC seasons
Toronto FC
Tor
Toronto FC